Long Valley Farm is a historic farm and national historic district located in Carvers Creek State Park near Spring Lake in Cumberland County and Harnett County, North Carolina.  It encompasses 24 contributing buildings and 5 contributing structures on a winter agricultural estate.  The main house is known as the Long Valley Farm Seat, or James Stillman Rockefeller Residence, and was built in 1937–1938. It is a two-story, five bay, Colonial Revival style frame dwelling with one-story wings.  Other notable contributing resources are the Mill Pavilion, Mill House and Gates, Pack House, Forge, Great Barn, Overseer's House, Tobacco Barns, Worker's Houses, Springhouse, and Water Tower.  Noted financier James Stillman Rockefeller become the full owner of Long Valley Farm in January 1937.

It was listed on the National Register of Historic Places in 1994.

See also
 Carvers Creek State Park

References

Farms on the National Register of Historic Places in North Carolina
Historic districts on the National Register of Historic Places in North Carolina
Colonial Revival architecture in North Carolina
Buildings and structures in Cumberland County, North Carolina
National Register of Historic Places in Cumberland County, North Carolina
Houses in Cumberland County, North Carolina
Buildings and structures in Harnett County, North Carolina
National Register of Historic Places in Harnett County, North Carolina
Open-air museums in North Carolina